Carbonellia is a genus of beetles in the family Carabidae, containing the following species:

 Carbonellia jolyi Mateu, 1985
 Carbonellia platensis (Berg, 1883)
 Carbonellia atra (Mateu, 1972)

References

Lebiinae